George Wilfrid Blenkin was Dean of St Albans from 1914 until his death in 1924.

Born into an ecclesiastical family on 16 February 1861 and educated at Harrow School and Trinity College, Cambridge, he was ordained in 1886. He was successively chaplain of Emmanuel College, Cambridge and then of Trinity College, Cambridge and finally  Vicar of Brading before his appointment as dean. He died on 24 September 1924.

References

External links
 

1861 births
People educated at Harrow School
Fellows of Trinity College, Cambridge
Deans of St Albans
1924 deaths
Alumni of Trinity College, Cambridge